Dorylus orientalis is an Asian species of army ants in the genus Dorylus. It can be found in Bangladesh, India, Myanmar, Nepal, Sri Lanka, Thailand, Vietnam, China, and Borneo.

Dorylus orientalis have two morphologically distinct series of workers that has not been known previously among army ants.

Subspecies
 Dorylus orientalis obscuriceps Santschi, 1920
 Dorylus orientalis orientalis Westwood, 1835

References

External links
 
  at antwiki.org

Dorylinae
Hymenoptera of Asia
Insects described in 1835